Michael Knieriem (born 24 May 1943 in Lahr) is a German historian and author and was director of the  museum.

The author of several historical textbooks on the Wuppertal area, where he had specialized in the life and work of Friedrich Engels, Knieren was director of the Historischen Zentrum for more than two decades until he retired in spring 2008.

In 2006, Knieriem was commissioned by the head of the cultural department  to clarify the role of Eduard von der Heydt in Nazi Germany, which was to influence the future role and the naming of the Von der Heydt Cultural Prize. As a result, the expert commission could not find any confirmation of Eduard von der Heydt's role as a Nazi, and the cultural prize was renamed Von der Heydt Cultural Prize.

References

External links 
 

20th-century German historians
Directors of museums in Germany
1943 births
Living people
People from Lahr